"Suddenly: Meguriaete/Brilliant Star" is the sixth single by Japanese singer and voice actress Nana Mizuki. It reached number 20 on the Japanese Oricon chart.

Track listing 
 
 Lyrics, composition, arrangement: Toshiro Yabuki
 Brilliant Star
 Lyrics, composition: Chiyomaru Shikura
 Arrangement: Toshimichi Isoe
 (Off Vocal ver.)
 Brilliant Star (Off Vocal ver.)

2002 singles
Nana Mizuki songs